is a multi-member district of the House of Councillors in the Diet of Japan (national legislature). It consists of Tochigi Prefecture and elects two Councillors, one per election.

Between 1947 and 2007 Tochigi was represented by four councillors, elected two at a time by single non-transferable vote. Like many two-member districts Tochigi often split seats between the two major postwar parties: the Liberal Democratic Party (LDP) and the Japan Socialist Party (JSP). In the 1965 election, left-wing Socialist incumbent Takeshi Tokano finished only third behind two LDP candidates while another Socialist candidate, Takashi Hagiwara, received almost as many votes as Tokano. In 1968, the LDP could repeat this success against incumbent Socialist Seiichi Inaba who finished only fourth behind Tokano, this time running as an independent. In the following election of 1971 Tokano returned as a Socialist candidate to his seat with the highest vote; and Seiichi Inaba became a Socialist Member of the House of Representatives where he was a member of the sp cial committee investigating the Lockheed scandal.

In the election of 1974, two independents, one DSP and one Kōmeitō candidate joined the traditional field of LDP, JSP and JCP candidates. Turnout jumped to 74% and independent Takaji Ōshima beat out LDP incumbent Yano for second place, but subsequently joined the LDP himself. Six years later, the leftist vote was still split among one Socialist, one Democratic Socialist and one Communist while there were only two LDP candidates on the conservative side: Once again, the party gained two Tochigi seats in one election. They held onto those seats until the 1990s when the declining JSP collapsed during the party's participation in a LDP government and was ultimately replaced by the Democratic Party of Japan as the largest opposition party.

Current Councillors 
Since the 2010 House of Councillors election, the district has been represented in the House of Councillors by 2 Councillors, with one Councillor being up for election every 3 years

As of 23 January 2023, the Councillors curently representing this district are as follows:

 Katsunori Takahashi (LDP) - Class of 2019
 Michiko Ueno (LDP) - Class of 2022

Since the 2013 House of Councillors election, the district has only been represented by members of the Liberal Democratic Party.

Elected Councillors

Election Results

Elections in the 2020s

Elections in the 2010s

Elections in the 2000s

Elections in the 1990s

Elections in the 1980s

Elections in the 1970s

Elections in the 1960s

Elections in the 1950s

Elections in the 1940s

References 
 House of Councillors: Alphabetical list of former Councillors

Districts of the House of Councillors (Japan)